Opal Sofer (born 20 May 1997) is an Israeli professional footballer who plays as a midfielder and has appeared for the Israel women's national team.

International career
Sofer has been capped for the Israel national team, appearing for the team during the 2019 FIFA Women's World Cup qualifying cycle.

International goals

References

External links
 
 
 

1997 births
Living people
Israeli women's footballers
Women's association football midfielders
Ligat Nashim players
Israel women's international footballers